Atatürk Stadium can refer to:

Antalya Atatürk Stadium, a football stadium in Antalya, Turkey
Atatürk Olympic Stadium, a football stadium in İstanbul, Turkey
Balıkesir Atatürk Stadium, a football stadium in Balıkesir, Turkey
Bursa Atatürk Stadium, a football stadium in Bursa, Turkey
Denizli Atatürk Stadium, a football stadium in Denizli, Turkey
Diyarbakır Atatürk Stadium, a football stadium in Diyarbakır, Turkey
Eskişehir Atatürk Stadium, a football stadium in Eskişehir, Turkey
İzmir Atatürk Stadium, a football stadium in İzmir, Turkey
Kayseri Atatürk Stadium, a former football stadium in Kayseri, Turkey
Konya Atatürk Stadium, a football stadium in Konya, Turkey
Lefkoşa Atatürk Stadı, a football stadium in Lefkoşa, Turkish Republic of Northern Cyprus
Rize Atatürk Stadium, an old football stadium in Rize, Turkey
Sakarya Atatürk Stadium, an old football stadium in Adapazarı, Turkey